The Kitchener-Waterloo Kodiaks were a Senior "A" box lacrosse team from Waterloo, Ontario. The Kodiaks played in the Eastern Division of the Major Series Lacrosse Senior "A" Lacrosse League where they competed in a 20 game regular season (10 at home) from May through July and playoffs beginning in August and ending with the Mann Cup in September. The Kodiaks played their home games at the Waterloo Memorial Recreation Complex, a multi-purpose recreational complex located in Waterloo, Ontario.

History
The Kodiaks competed in the OLA Senior B League starting in 2003. However, on March 12, 2006, the Ontario Lacrosse Association approved the sale of the St. Catharines Athletics franchise to the Kodiaks and the subsequent promotion to the Sr. A loop for the 2007 season. After years of declining support and attendance for the team, owner Al Orth sold the team to a group of investors from Cobourg, Ontario. The Kodiaks last season in Kitchener-Waterloo was the 2015 season with the team moving to Cobourg for the 2016 season.

Season-by-Season results

Presidents Cup Results

References

External links
Archived Kitchener–Waterloo Kodiaks Webpage
 The Bible of Lacrosse
 Unofficial OLA Page
 Major Series Lacrosse

Ontario Lacrosse Association teams
Sport in Kitchener, Ontario